Bosnia and Herzegovina competed at the 2020 Summer Paralympics in Tokyo, Japan, from 24 August to 5 September 2021. This was their seventh consecutive appearance at the Summer Paralympics since 1996.

Medalists

Athletics

Shooting

Bosnia and Herzegovina entered two athletes into the Paralympic competition. Ervin Bejdic & Zerina Skomorac successfully break the Paralympic qualification at the 2019 WSPS World Championships which was held in Sydney, Australia.

Sitting volleyball 

The men's sitting volleyball team qualified for the 2020 Summer Paralympics after winning the silver medal at the 2018 World ParaVolley Championships.

Semifinals

Bronze medal match

Table tennis

See also 
 Bosnia and Herzegovina at the Paralympics
 Bosnia and Herzegovina at the 2020 Summer Olympics

References 

Nations at the 2020 Summer Paralympics
2020
2021 in Bosnia and Herzegovina sport